Crawford Corners is an unincorporated community in Medina County, in the U.S. state of Ohio.

History
A variant name was Crawfords Mills. A post office called Crawford's Mills was established in 1853, and remained in operation until 1859. The community was named for Joseph Crawford, a pioneer who settled near the site in 1819.

References

Unincorporated communities in Medina County, Ohio
Unincorporated communities in Ohio